An unsigned highway is a highway that has been assigned a route number, but does not bear road markings that would conventionally be used to identify the route with that number. Highways are left unsigned for a variety of reasons, and examples are found throughout the world. Depending on the policy of the agency that maintains the highway, and the reason for not signing the route, the route may instead be signed a different designation from its actual number, with small inventory markers for internal use, or with nothing at all.

Background
There are a variety of cases where roads are officially designated, but have no markings to show that designation. Many highway maintenance agencies assign some form of number to all highways, bridges, and other features they maintain for tracking and inventory purposes. However, policies vary regarding how and when to publicly post these assigned numbers. Several highway maintenance agencies have multiple numbering systems for the different classes of routes they maintain (freeways, expressways, rural roads, etc.). In such cases, one or more class of numbers may be reserved for minor routes and these may or may not be signed. Often roads that serve as a connector to a major highway are signed to show the connection to the major road, rather than the road's actual designation. Some highways are not signed to avoid multiple designations, such as when the entire route runs concurrent with other highways. There are several instances where a route has officially been given a name by government agencies, and is signed with that name, but the route is also assigned a number by the highway maintenance agencies as to fit in their maintenance and inventory systems. Another common reason to not sign a highway is where the highway is government maintained, but is of little value to the general public.

Examples

Highway maintenance agencies with multiple numbering systems
The C, D, and U road systems in the Great Britain road numbering scheme are systems of routes considered less important than B roads and typically left unsigned.
Delaware, New York, and Pennsylvania, among other jurisdictions, sign virtually all state maintained transportation features with small inventory markers, called maintenance road numbers (reference numbers), reference routes, and Quadrant Routes respectively.
Secondary highways in states such as Montana are often unsigned (or minimally signed) when they pass through city or urban limits.

Signed with a name and not a number 
Queen Elizabeth Way (Highway 451) in Ontario
Skyline Drive and Blue Ridge Parkway (State Route 48) in Virginia
Florida's Turnpike (State Road 91) in Florida
Canal Parkway (State Route 61) in Maryland
Several parkways and toll roads in New Jersey, including: Garden State Parkway (Route 444), southern portion of the New Jersey Turnpike (Route 700), the Palisades Interstate Parkway (Route 445 in New Jersey) and the Atlantic City Expressway (Route 446).
 The  Kentucky parkway system of former toll roads were initially signed exclusively with their names, although all carry an unsigned designation above 9000.

Concurrencies
There are numerous cases in the United States where the same physical roadbed has designations in the Interstate Highway System, U.S. Highway system and the state route system. In many cases one or more of the official designations is omitted.
Many examples exist in the western United States where an Interstate highway runs concurrent with a U.S. or state highway, but only the Interstate designation is signed, though any route that becomes unsigned in these situations will still be signed on many road maps and atlases. Examples include U.S. Route 6 which is unsigned while concurrent with Interstate 70 throughout Colorado and U.S. Route 77 through the Dallas metropolitan area.
Conversely, there are several urban freeways in the U.S. that have an unsigned Interstate Highway designation. Examples include: Interstate 444 in Oklahoma, Interstate 345 in Texas, Interstate 305 in California, and Interstate 595 in Maryland.
The Interstate Highway System includes highways outside the contiguous United States. While the interstate highways in Hawaii are signed similar to those in the contiguous United States, those in Alaska and Puerto Rico are signed with their state/territory route designation, not Interstate Highway shields.
In the states of Alabama, Florida, and Tennessee, every US Highway is concurrent with an unsigned state highway for its entire length. In the states of Florida and Georgia, every Interstate Highway is concurrent with an unsigned state highway for its entire length. In Tennessee, the state highway route number is signed along the green mile marker signs that display mileage within each county.

Other situations
There are a small number of cases where a highway briefly crosses a political boundary, but is only signed with its designation on one side of that political boundary. Examples include the Alaska Highway which crosses the boundary of the Canadian province of British Columbia and Yukon Territory several times. Although the highway has different numbered designations on each side of the border, the signs along the highway only change designation at one point. Another example is Washington State Route 41, the unsigned designation for a brief portion of the highway signed Idaho State Highway 41 that crosses the state line.
The East Los Angeles Interchange is a case where a highway is unsigned with a conflict between the state and federal definition of a highway. The state definition of Interstate 10 has a discontinuity with a stub freeway proceeding west from the northern part of this interchange towards U.S. Route 101, while the federal definition of I-10 is contiguous. The discrepancy is resolved by having westbound signage at the interchange follow the federal definition. Driving westbound, I-10 is signed proceeding towards the main portion of interchange concurrent with I-5, while the I-10 stub is signed instead as US 101.

References

Road infrastructure
Highways